Flight 221 may refer to:

Aeropesca Colombia Flight 221, crashed on 26 August 1981
Kuwait Airways Flight 221, hijacked on 3 December 1984
Gabon Express Flight 221, crashed on 8 June 2004

0221